This is a list of Forward operating bases.

A forward operating base (FOB) is any secured forward military position, commonly a military base, that is used to support tactical operations. A FOB may or may not contain an airfield, hospital, or other facilities. The base may be used for an extended period of time. FOBs are traditionally supported by Main Operating Bases that are required to provide backup support to them. A FOB also improves reaction time to local areas as opposed to having all troops on the main operating base.

In its most basic form, a FOB consists of a ring of barbed wire around a position with a fortified entry control point, or ECP. More advanced FOBs include an assembly of earthen dams, concrete barriers, gates, watchtowers, bunkers and other force protection infrastructure. They are often built from Hesco bastions.

American FOBs in Iraq

Closed British FOBs in Afghanistan

FOBs in Afghanistan

FOBs in the United States

 Papago Farms FOB, Sells, Arizona
San Miguel FOB, San Miguel, Arizona
FOB Border Wolf, Deming, New Mexico 
 FOB Cannon, Yuma, Arizona
 CBP FOB Desert Grip, Arizona (Also known as Camp Grip and Desert Camp Grip.) Located approximately 75 miles southeast of Yuma, Arizona in the US Border Patrol's Yuma Sector.
 Donna Anna Base Camp/FOB, New Mexico, used for training purposes
 Lordsburg/FOB, New Mexico
 Hedglen FOB, Tucson, Arizona
 FOB Sentinel, Goodfellow Air Force Base, Texas
 Sea-Based X-Band Radar FOB, Adak, Alaska
 FOB Mailfoot, Fort Benning, Georgia

See also
 Advance airfield
 Advanced Landing Ground
 Fire support base
 Forward Operating Site
 Loss of Strength Gradient
 Main Operating Base

References

Lists of military installations